St Giles-without-Cripplegate is an Anglican church in the City of London, located on Fore Street within the modern Barbican complex. When built it stood without (that is, outside) the city wall, near the Cripplegate. The church is dedicated to St Giles, patron saint of handicapped and infirm people of many different kinds. It is one of the few medieval churches left in the City of London, having survived the Great Fire of 1666.
Today, this ancient sanctuary is a thriving and welcoming community of faith serving The City businesses and civic life, thousands of local residents, schools and other institutions, and the arts.

History
There had been a Saxon church on the site in the 11th century but by 1090 it had been replaced by a Norman one. In 1394 it was rebuilt in the perpendicular gothic style. The stone tower was added in 1682.

The church has been badly damaged by fire on three occasions: In 1545, in 1897 and during an  air raid of the Blitz of the Second World War . German bombs completely gutted the church but it was restored using the plans of the reconstruction of 1545. A new ring of twelve bells was cast by Mears and Stainbank in 1954, and this was augmented with a sharp second bell cast in 2006 by the Whitechapel Bell Foundry. The historic pews, altar and font come from the nearby St Luke Old Street, and were transferred to St Giles when it closed and the parishes were amalgamated in 1959.

The church was designated a Grade I listed building on 4 January 1950.

Notable people associated with the church

 John Field, curate of the church, c. 1570
 John Foxe, author of the Book of Martyrs, surrogate for Crowley c. 1565 and buried in the church, 1587
 Robert Crowley, rector of St Giles's and Protestant polemicist was buried in the church in 1588
 Thomas Deloney, English novelist and balladist, had his son baptised in the church in 1586
 Lancelot Andrewes, rector of the church after Crowley
 Roger Townshend, buried in the church in 1590
 Sir Martin Frobisher, captain who fought against the Spanish Armada, buried in the church, 1594
Sir Francis Willoughby, industrialist and coalowner, buried in the church in 1596
 Nathaniel Eaton, first schoolmaster of Harvard College, baptised in the church in 1610
 Oliver Cromwell, military commander and Lord Protector of England during the Commonwealth, married Elizabeth Bourchier in the church, 1620
 Nicholas Tooley, Shakespearean actor, shareholder  in the Globe Theatre, buried 5 June 1623
 John Speed, author of the Theatre of the Empire of Great Britaine, buried in the church in 1629
 John Milton, author of Paradise Lost, buried in the church in 1674
 John Bunyan, author of The Pilgrim's Progress, attended the church
 Daniel Defoe, author of Robinson Crusoe, died in the parish, 1731
 Mark Catesby, naturalist, artist, and author of Natural History of Carolina, Florida and the Bahama Islands (1729–1747), was a parishioner and several of his children were baptised in the church, and later buried in the churchyard
 Rick Wakeman, keyboardist, recorded his track "Jane Seymour" (from The Six Wives of Henry VIII) and the pipe organ parts in the third section of Yes track "Close to the Edge" using the pipe organ in the church
 Jack Nitzsche, composer, pianist, recorded "St. Giles Cripplegate" with the London Symphony Orchestra in 1972

Layout of the church

 John Milton buried here in 1674
 The altar from St. Luke's, Old Street, which was dismantled in the 1960s due to subsidence.
 The east window. Designed by the Nicholson Studios, following the pattern of the original medieval window.
 Sedilia (where the priest sat) and piscina of the medieval church.
 Display cabinet containing the historic treasures of Cripplegate.
 John Foxe, author of "The Book of Martyrs" is buried here.
 Plaque commemorating Sir Martin Frobisher, explorer and sea Captain.
 Bust of John Speed, map maker and historian.
 Statue of John Milton by Horace Montford
 The organ. From St. Luke's, Old Street
 Bust of Daniel Defoe, author of "Robinson Crusoe" and John Milton.
 Busts of Oliver Cromwell and John Bunyan, author of "Pilgrim's Progress".
 Portrait of Dr. William Nicholls, the first Rector of St. Luke's Church and Vicar of St. Giles'.
 The West Window – shows the coats of arms of the Archbishop of Canterbury, the Bishop of London, Milton, Cromwell and Frobisher.
 The font – from St. Luke's Church.
 The Cripplegate Window which celebrates the centenary of the charity The Cripplegate Foundation.
 Bust of Sir William Staines, Lord Mayor of London in 1801.

See also

 List of buildings that survived the Great Fire of London
List of churches and cathedrals of London

References

External links

 St Giles's Church website

Church of England church buildings in the City of London
Giles
Diocese of London
Barbican Estate
Grade I listed churches in the City of London
Churches in the City of London